Colleen Margaret Fletcher (née Dalton; born 23 November 1954) is a British Labour Party politician. She was first elected as the Member of Parliament (MP) for Coventry North East in the 2015 general election. Prior to her parliamentary career, she was a local councillor.

Early life
Colleen Margaret Dalton was born on 23 November 1954 in Coventry, England to William Charles and Dot Dalton. Her mother was a Labour councillor on Coventry City Council. She grew up in Coventry and attended Richard Lee Primary School, Lyng Hall School, and the further education college Henley College.

Political career
Fletcher represented Wyken ward on Coventry City Council from 1992 to 2000 and between 2002 and 2004. In 2011, Fletcher was elected as a Labour Party councillor for the Upper Stoke ward on the same council.

In December 2013, she was selected as the Labour candidate for Coventry North East. The seat had been represented by a Labour MP since its formation in 1974. Fletcher was elected as MP with a majority of 11,775 (29.1%). She was re-elected in the 2017 general election.

She supported Owen Smith in the failed attempt to replace Jeremy Corbyn in the 2016 Labour leadership election. Since October 2017, Fletcher has sat on the Administration Committee and is an opposition whip.

Fletcher supported the United Kingdom (UK) remaining within the European Union (EU) in the 2016 UK EU membership referendum. In the indicative votes on 27 March 2019, she voted for a referendum on a Brexit withdrawal agreement, for the Norway-plus model, and for a customs union with the EU.

On 5 September 2022, she announced she would be standing down at the next general election.

Personal life
She married Ian Richard Fletcher in 1972; the couple have two sons.

References

External links 

1954 births
Living people
Coventry City Councillors
Female members of the Parliament of the United Kingdom for English constituencies
Labour Party (UK) councillors
Labour Party (UK) MPs for English constituencies
Members of Parliament for Coventry
UK MPs 2015–2017
UK MPs 2017–2019
UK MPs 2019–present
21st-century British women politicians
21st-century English women
21st-century English people
Women councillors in England